Gondola Point is a Canadian suburban community located in Kings County, New Brunswick.

Formerly an incorporated village, it was amalgamated with the town of Quispamsis in 1998.

Geography 
Gondola Point is located in the southeast of the country, 800 km east of Ottawa.

Surroundings are quite densely populated, with 222 inhabitants per square kilometer. The area is a part of the hemiboreal climate zone. the average annual temperature in the area is 5 °C. The warmest month is July, when the average temperature is 18 °C, and the coldest is January, with -12 °C. The average annual rainfall is 1,789 millimetres. The rainiest month is December, with an average of 257 mm of precipitation, and the driest is August, with 80 mm of precipitation.

Notable people

See also
List of Neighbourhoods in New Brunswick

References

Neighbourhoods in New Brunswick
Populated places disestablished in 1998
Former villages in New Brunswick